Pavel Leonidovich Ipatov (born 12 April 1950) is a Russian politician who served as Governor of Saratov Oblast from 2005 until 23 March 2012. He was the first governor appointed by president Vladimir Putin. Ipatov is a member of United Russia. He was previously the director of a nuclear power plant.

Career 
Ipatov was born in the village of Asbestovsky in Sverdlovsk Oblast and studied at the Urals Political College in Sverdlovsk. In 1975 he graduated from the Ural State Technical University with a degree in electrical engineering and joined the power generation industry. During the 1980s he was manager at the South Ukraine Nuclear Power Plant and became chief engineer at the Balakovo Nuclear Power Plant in 1985 and managing director of this plant in 1989. He became deputy managing director of Energoatom in 2002.

He was a deputy of the Balakovo city council from 1996 to 2004, before being appointed governor of Saratov Oblast in 2005.

On 23 March 2012, he resigned from the post according to the Decree of the President of the Russian Federation to be replaced by Valery Radayev. The wording in the Decree was “resignation according to his own will”.

Awards 
Order of the Red Banner of Labour (1988)
Prize of the Council of Ministers of the Soviet Union (1991)
Order of Friendship of Peoples (1994)
Order of Honour (2000)

References 

1950 births
21st-century Russian politicians
Living people
Governors of Saratov Oblast
Recipients of the Order of Friendship of Peoples
Recipients of the Order of Honour (Russia)
Recipients of the Order of the Red Banner of Labour
Russian nuclear physicists
United Russia politicians